This list of international broadcasters lists those broadcasting services which broadcast programs for an external audience.

Radio

Africa

Asia

Europe

North & South America

Oceania

Television

Europe 

 An alliance of France Télévisions & Arte in France, RTBF in Wallonia, Belgium, Radio-Canada, Télé-Québec and TVA in Canada, TSR in Switzerland & RFO in Overseas France

North & South America 

 Under United States law (the Smith-Mundt Act of 1948), the Voice of America is forbidden to broadcast directly to American citizens.
 The countries are Venezuela, Argentina, Cuba, and Uruguay.

Middle East

Asia

Oceania 

Internationally, TVNZ has helped provide television services in Pacific Island nations such as the Cook Islands, Fiji, and the Solomon Islands.

TVNZ provides much of the programming but scheduling and continuity are done locally.

 Because of its history TVNZ has inherited and developed its own services in the production and broadcasting services area.
 These include The New Zealand Television Archive, production facilities, television school.
 TVNZ also operated a satellite services division organising and downlink facilities and across the globe, but this service was wound down in 2005.

Both TV One and TV2 are also available "in the clear" over DVB-S on Optus B1. A SKY TV set-top box is not required as any DVB-S satellite set-top box or tuner will work.

Africa

Former international broadcasters

 Radio Vlaanderen Internationaal was replaced with internet and satellite broadcasts of Radio 1 and Radio 2.

See also
 International BBC television channels
 U.S. Agency for Global Media
 List of news television channels

Broadcasting lists